Chuharwal  is a village in Kapurthala district of Punjab State, India. The village is administrated by a Sarpanch, who is an elected representative.

Demography 
According to the report published by Census India in 2011, Chuharwal has a total number of 176 houses and population of 802, which include 400 males and 402 females. Literacy rate of Chuharwal is 51,44%, lower than state average of 75.84%.  The population of children under the age of 6 years is 143 which is 17.83% of total population of Chuharwal, and child sex ratio is approximately  907, higher than state average of 846.

Caste  
The village has schedule caste (SC) constitutes 78.80% of total population of the village and it doesn't have any Schedule Tribe (ST) population.

Population data

Air travel connectivity 
The closest airport to the village is Sri Guru Ram Dass Jee International Airport.

Villages in Kapurthala

External links
  Villages in Kapurthala
 Kapurthala Villages List

References

Villages in Kapurthala district